"From Here to Eternity" is a song by Italian singer, songwriter, and producer Giorgio Moroder, released in 1977 as a single from an album of the same name.

Song information
The song was written by Giorgio Moroder and Pete Bellotte, and produced by Moroder. The song is performed entirely on electronic keyboards and showcases the synthesized futuristic sound which Moroder also explored on Donna Summer's I Remember Yesterday (most notably the single "I Feel Love") and Once Upon a Time, both released in 1977.

On most editions of the single, "Utopia - Me Giorgio" was released as the B-side. Upon its original release, the single received a 5-star review in Blues & Soul magazine. In a retrospective AllMusic review, John Bush marked the song as one of the highlights on its parent album.

"From Here to Eternity" was featured in the 1978 movie Thank God It's Friday, but not included on the soundtrack album.

Two re-recordings of the song were made for the 2000 various artists compilation DJ Empire Presents: A Tribute to Giorgio Moroder. First was the remix by Danny Tenaglia, released as the single in various formats, which was a club chart hit in the US. The other version was produced by American musician Eric D. Clark, with French singer Amanda Lear on vocals, credited to Giorgio Moroder vs. Eric D. Clark feat. Amanda Lear. A short version of the Tox N Stone remix also appeared on Lear's hits compilation Forever Glam! in 2005.

"From Here to Eternity", along with other tracks from the same album, was featured in the popular video game Grand Theft Auto: Liberty City Stories (2005) on fictional radio station Flashback FM.

Music video
The music video pictures Moroder performing the song and playing keyboards in a studio, interspersed with footage of a woman dancing against a black background. Halfway through the video, "From Here to Eternity" segues into "Utopia - Me Giorgio".

Track listing

7" Single (1977)
A. "From Here to Eternity" – 3:52
B. "Utopia" – 4:17

7" Single (UK, 1977)
A. "From Here to Eternity" – 3:52
B. "Too Hot to Handle" – 4:51

7" Single (Bolivia, 1979)
A. "From Here to Eternity"
B. "First Hand Experience in Second Hand Love"

CD Maxi Single (2000) – Giorgio Moroder vs. Danny Tenaglia
 "From Here to Eternity" (Danny Tenaglia Radio Edit) – 4:34
 "From Here to Eternity" (Danny Tenaglia Extended Club Mix) – 13:04
 "From Here to Eternity" (Danny Tenaglia Dub Mix) – 9:35
 "From Here to Eternity" (Danny's New Dub) – 8:50
 "From Here to Eternity" (Danny Tenaglia Padapella) – 2:47

12" Single (2000) – Giorgio Moroder vs. Eric D. Clark feat. Amanda Lear
A. "From Here to Eternity" (Tox N Stone Club Mix) – 6:25
B1. "From Here to Eternity" (Eric D. Clark Passport) – 7:01
B2. "From Here to Eternity" (Whirlpool Maximum Passion Mix) – 8:10

Chart performance

References

1977 singles
1977 songs
2000 singles
Amanda Lear songs
Giorgio Moroder songs
Songs written by Giorgio Moroder
Songs written by Pete Bellotte
Song recordings produced by Giorgio Moroder